Smash Palace is a New Zealand feature film that premiered at Cannes in May 1981 and was released theatrically in April 1982. The film chronicles a former race car driver (played by Bruno Lawrence) who inadvertently contributes to the end of his marriage, then kidnaps his daughter (Greer Robson). Lawrence's character runs a carwrecking yard in an isolated area of New Zealand's North Island.

Smash Palace was the second feature directed by Roger Donaldson. Critical acclaim in the United States won him interest from Hollywood, and the chance to direct the first of a number of films financed outside of New Zealand, The Bounty.

The soundtrack was composed and performed by New Zealand-born singer Sharon O'Neill. Smash Palace has an R16 rating.

Plot
Retired international racing driver Al Shaw returns home to take over his late father's car-wrecking yard, "Smash Palace", on the remote North Island Volcanic Plateau. Al's French-born wife Jacqui is increasingly unhappy with Al's obsession with cars and refusal to sell the yard, and fears for the future of their daughter Georgie.

Jacqui begins a relationship with Al's best friend, local police officer Ray Foley. When Al finds Jacqui and Ray together, he violently beats and rapes his wife. Jacqui leaves Al, taking Georgie with her. Jacqui subsequently takes up a job as a teacher and continues her relationship with Ray.

Al can't adjust to the separation and harasses Jacqui in his constant efforts to see his daughter. Al plans to make a racing comeback, and Jacqui forbids Al from taking Georgie to the race. In response, he destroys part of Jacqui's house with his tow truck, and is arrested. Jacqui subsequently takes out a protection order on Al to prevent him seeing Georgie.

Al sets up a hideout deep in the bush, then kidnaps Georgie from Jacqui at gunpoint. He pushes his tow truck off a cliff into a river to create a diversion for police.

Al and Georgie get reacquainted in their bush hideout, but suddenly Georgie falls ill. Al drives into town and robs a pharmacy at gunpoint, where he is spotted by a patrolling police car. He takes the pharmacist hostage and flees with her and Georgie back to Smash Palace.

Ray and Jacqui arrive at the hostage scene. Jacqui defies orders and runs through the cordon to reunite with her husband and daughter. Al hands over Georgie, and agrees to let the pharmacist go in exchange for Ray.

Cast
 Bruno Lawrence as Al Shaw
 Anna Jemison as Jacqui Shaw 
 Greer Robson as Georgie Shaw
 Keith Aberdein as Ray Foley, policeman
 Desmond Kelly as Tiny 
 Sean Duffy as Frank
 Lyn Robson as Linda
 Margaret Umbers as Rose
 Roy Sturch as crash car driver
 Buick as Jazz the dog

Production
The film was funded by the New Zealand Film Commission. When Donaldson first applied for funding, he was turned down. On a second attempt he was once again denied funding, until veteran film maker John O’Shea pointed out that Donaldson's earlier work Sleeping Dogs had been the reason the commission was founded.

One of the conditions of the film's eventual funding by the NZFC was that it be completed in time to screen at the 1981 Cannes Film Festival. This forced a tight schedule on the production team, giving only four months between the commencement of the shoot and the film's premiere.

Release and reception
Although the film was completely New Zealand financed and shot, the film was first released in the USA. The expectation was that by initially releasing in the US the film would gain positive reviews from international critics, thus encouraging local audiences, prone to a dismissal of Kiwi product as amateurish, to go and see the film. The strategy worked, with the film proving hugely successful in New Zealand.

The film won much acclaim for the performance of Bruno Lawrence, one of New Zealand's best-known actors. It was successful in its home land, and received positive reviews in the United States; Veteran critic Pauline Kael described it as "amazingly accomplished". Roger Ebert called it one of the best films of 1981, "so emotionally wise and observant that we learn from it why people sometimes make the front pages with guns in their hands and try to explain that it's all because of love". The New York Times picked it as one of its ten best movies of the year.

At the 1982 Manila Film Festival, Bruno Lawrence received an award for Best Actor for his portrayal of Al Shaw.

Location
Much of the film was shot on location at car dismantling business Horopito Motors, which has existed on the same site since the 1940s, in the former town of Horopito near Ohakune. A scene from road movie Goodbye Pork Pie was also shot in the same location. More recently the finale of Hunt for the Wilderpeople was shot at the same site, referencing both the above films.

Soundtrack 

A soundtrack was released in 1982, featuring five songs by New Zealand singer songwriter Sharon O'Neill. It won Best Film Soundtrack/Cast Recording/Compilation at the 1983 New Zealand Music Awards.

References

External links

Smash Palace at New Zealand Film Commission
Smash Palace at NZ On Screen

1981 drama films
1981 films
1980s New Zealand films
Atlantic Entertainment Group films
New Zealand auto racing films
Films directed by Roger Donaldson
Films set in New Zealand
Films shot in New Zealand
New Zealand drama films
1980s English-language films